Saarijärvi-Viitasaari sub-region  is a subdivision of Central Finland and one of the Sub-regions of Finland since 2009.

Municipalities
Saarijärvi area
Kannonkoski
Karstula
Kivijärvi
Kyyjärvi
Saarijärvi
Viitasaari area
Kinnula
Pihtipudas
Viitasaari

Politics
Results of the 2018 Finnish presidential election:

 Sauli Niinistö   60.9%
 Matti Vanhanen   10.7%
 Paavo Väyrynen   9.2%
 Laura Huhtasaari   6.9%
 Pekka Haavisto   5.9%
 Tuula Haatainen   4.0%
 Merja Kyllönen   2.2%
 Nils Torvalds   0.3%

Sub-regions of Finland
Geography of Central Finland